Mittag may refer to:

 Anja Mittag (born 1985), German international footballer
 Gösta Mittag-Leffler (1846–1927), Swedish mathematician
 Günter Mittag (1926–1994), central figure in the German planned economy
 Susanne Mittag (born 1958), German politician

Surnames from nicknames
German-language surnames
Jewish surnames